William Forwood may refer to:
 William Bower Forwood, English merchant, shipowner and politician
 William H. Forwood, United States Army surgeon general
 Bill Forwood, Australian politician